Oussama Targhalline (born 20 May 2002) is a Moroccan professional footballer who plays as a midfielder for  club Le Havre.

Club career 
Targhalline began his career at the Mohammed VI Academy in Salé, Morocco before signing his first professional contract with Marseille at the age of 18. He scored his first senior goal for the club in a mid-season friendly match against Nîmes; Marseille went on to win the match 4–1. Targhalline made his first-team competitive debut for Marseille in a 4–1 Coupe de France win over Cannet Rocheville on 19 December 2021. He made his Ligue 1 debut in a 1–0 win over Bordeaux on 7 January 2022. On 1 August 2022, Targhalline was loaned to Turkish side Alanyaspor.

On 7 January 2023, after being recalled from the loan spell, Targhalline joined Ligue 2 side Le Havre on a permanent deal, signing a contract until June 2025, with an option for another year.

International career 
Targhalline has represented Morocco at under-17 and under-20 levels. He was on the final list to participate in the 2020 UNAF U-20 Tournament qualifying for the 2021 Africa U-20 Cup of Nations, and participated in all matches, scoring one goal against Libya.

Honours 
Morocco U20
 UNAF U-20 Tournament: 2020

References

2002 births
Living people
Moroccan footballers
Association football midfielders
Mohammed VI Football Academy players
Olympique de Marseille players
Alanyaspor footballers
Le Havre AC players
Championnat National 2 players
Ligue 1 players

Morocco youth international footballers
Moroccan expatriate footballers
Expatriate footballers in France
Moroccan expatriate sportspeople in France
Expatriate footballers in Turkey
Moroccan expatriate sportspeople in Turkey